Moonwalk is a 1988 autobiography written by American recording artist Michael Jackson. The book was first published by Doubleday on February 1, 1988, five months after the release of Jackson's 1987 Bad album, and named after Jackson's signature dance move, the moonwalk. The book contains a foreword by Jacqueline Onassis. It reached number one on the New York Times Best Seller list. The book was reissued by Doubleday on October 13, 2009, following Jackson's death on June 25, 2009.

Production 

Jacqueline Onassis, who was an editor at Doubleday, secured the book deal and paid Jackson a $300,000 advance. As part of the deal Jackson wanted Onassis to write a foreword, which she initially refused not wanting her name on any books she worked on but agreed to three paragraphs. She also edited the book. 
The first manuscript of the book was written by Robert Hilburn and was refused by the publishers, Doubleday, because it lacked "juicy details". A second manuscript was written by Stephen Davis, which Jackson drastically edited. Jackson finally decided to write the book himself, with help from Shaye Areheart.

Due to the public interest in Jackson, Moonwalk was prepared for publication in secret. Relatives of Doubleday employees were hired as couriers, to deliver portions of the book from the company's head office in Manhattan to the printing plant in Fairfield, Pennsylvania. At the printing plant, the book was given the code name "Neil Armstrong", after the first "moonwalker".

Narrative
Dedicated to Fred Astaire, the book discusses Jackson's show business friends, girlfriends and his rise to fame. The book also discusses Jackson's appearance and thoughts on plastic surgery. Jackson stated that up to that point, he had two rhinoplastic surgeries and the surgical creation of a cleft in his chin. He attributed the change in the structure of his face to puberty, weight loss, a strict vegetarian diet, a change in hair style and stage lighting.

In the book, Jackson tells of the beatings he received from his father, Joseph. While rehearsing with The Jackson 5, Jackson stated that when they messed up they "got hit, sometimes with a belt, sometimes with a switch." The singer added that his father was "real strict" and "something of a mystery". In September 1988, Jackson telephoned his father to apologize for some of the material in the autobiography. He explained that he hadn't written the book himself and that the critical content was written by "someone else". The singer also reveals how much he has been hurt by the press, asking, "What happened to truth? Did it go out of style?"

Reception
Moonwalk debuted at number one on both the British newspaper The Times and the Los Angeles Times bestseller lists. Reaching number two in its first week on The New York Times Best Seller list, Moonwalk reached number one the following week. Within a few months of its release, Moonwalk had sold 450,000 copies in fourteen countries.

Ken Tucker, of The New York Times, stated that if the book had been written by anyone else, it would be dismissed as "an assiduously unrevealing, frequently tedious document." However, he adds that "these are precisely the qualities that make it fascinating".

Re-release

Moonwalk was re-released on October 13, 2009, as a result of Michael Jackson's death, with a new foreword by Motown founder Berry Gordy and afterword by Shaye Areheart.

Notes

References
 
 
 
 Music Book review

External links

 Michael Jackson's Official website

Works about Michael Jackson
1988 non-fiction books
African-American autobiographies
American autobiographies
Books by Michael Jackson
Doubleday (publisher) books
Music autobiographies